People with the given name Mary Sue include:
Mary Sue McCulloch (1913–1996), American philanthropist, croquet player, author and granddaughter of John I. Beggs
 Mary Sue Hubbard (1931–2002), the third wife of L. Ron Hubbard 1952–1986
 Mary Sue Coleman (born 1943), president of the University of Michigan 2002–2014
 Mary Sue Terry (born 1947), American politician from Virginia
 Mary Sue Milliken (active since 1981), American chef
 Mary Sue Price (active since 1997), an American playwright